Ehren Beau M. Painter (born 21 March 1998) is an English professional rugby union player who plays for Northampton Saints as a Tighthead Prop.

Painter was born in London, and educated at Felsted School.

Painter represented England at Under-16s, Under-17s, and Under-18s. In May 2018, Painter was included in the England Under-20 squad for the 2018 World Rugby Under 20 Championship. He started in the final as England finished runners up to hosts France.

In April 2018, Painter made his first-team debut for the Northampton Saints in a Premiership match against Saracens.

On the 14th of March 2023, rivals Exeter Chiefs announced the immediate signing of Ehren Painter for the remainder of the 2022/2023 season.

References

External links
Northampton Saints profile

1998 births
Living people
English rugby union players
Northampton Saints players
People educated at Felsted School
Rugby union players from London
Rugby union props